Parliamentary elections were held in Cyprus on 19 May 1991. The result was a victory for the Democratic Rally, which won 20 of the 56 seats. Voter turnout was 93%.

Results

References

1991 in Cyprus
Cyprus
Legislative elections in Cyprus
May 1991 events in Europe